The 2000 Air Canada Cup was Canada's 22nd annual national midget 'AAA' hockey championship, played April 24–30, 2000 at the Maurice Richard Arena in Montreal, Quebec.  The championship game was an all-Quebec showdown as the Quebec champions Cantonniers de Magog shutout the host Collége Français de Montréal-Bourassa 6-0 in the gold medal game to win the national championship.

Future National Hockey League players competing in this tournament were Joffrey Lupul and Ryane Clowe.

Teams

Round robin

Standings

Scores

Fort Saskatchewan 6 - Saskatoon 4
Magog 14 - Richmond Hill 3
Montréal-Bourassa 6 - St. John's 4
Saskatoon 7 - Richmond Hill 0
Fort Saskatchewan 5 - St. John's 1
Magog 5 - Montréal-Bourassa 3
Richmond Hill 4 - St. John's 2
Magog 7 - Saskatoon 3
Montréal-Bourassa 5 - Fort Saskatchewan 2
Magog 8 - St. John's 2
Fort Saskatchewan 9 - Richmond Hill 0
Montréal-Bourassa 2 - Saskatoon 1
Fort Saskatchewan 3 - Magog 2
St. John's 4 - Saskatoon 4
Montréal-Bourassa 9 - Richmond Hill 2

Playoffs

Semi-finals
Magog 4 - Saskatoon 3
Montréal-Bourassa 4 - Fort Saskatchewan 1

Bronze-medal game
Saskatoon 6 - Fort Saskatchewan 5

Gold-medal game
Magog 6 - Montréal-Bourassa 0

Individual awards
Most Valuable Player: Jean-François Kingsley (Montréal-Bourassa)
Top Scorer: Josh Welter (Fort Saskatchewan)
Top Forward: Josh Welter (Fort Saskatchewan)
Top Defenceman: Francis Trudel (Magog)
Top Goaltender: Geoff McIntosh (Saskatoon)
Most Sportsmanlike Player: Brent Roach (St. John's)

Regional Playdowns

Atlantic Region 
The St. John's Maple Leafs advanced by winning their regional tournament, which was played April 6–9, 2000 in St. John's, Newfoundland.

Quebec 
The Cantonniers de Magog advanced by capturing the Quebec Midget AAA League title.

Central Region 
The Richmond Hill Stars advanced by winning their regional tournament, which was played April 4–9, 2000 in Toronto, Ontario.
Teams competing
Don Mills Flyers (host)
Lambton Lightning
Mississauga Reps
Ottawa Sting
Richmond Hill Stars
Southwest Storm
Timmins Majors

West Region 
The Saskatoon Contacts advanced by winning their regional tournament, which was played April 6–9, 2000 in Souris, Manitoba.
Teams competing
Eastman Selects
Saskatoon Contacts
Southwest Cougars (host)
Thunder Bay Kings

Pacific Region 
The Fort Saskatchewan Rangers advanced by winning their regional tournament, which was played April 7–9, 2000 in Kamloops, British Columbia.
Teams competing
Fort Saskatchewan Rangers
Kamloops
Northwest Territories

See also
Telus Cup

References

External links
2000 Air Canada Cup Home Page
Hockey Canada-Telus Cup Guide and Record Book

Telus Cup
Air Canada Cup
Ice hockey competitions in Montreal
April 2000 sports events in Canada
2000 in Quebec
2000s in Montreal